Mohamed Bouherrafa also called as Neto (born 9 September 2000) is a French footballer who plays as a defender.

Career statistics

Club

Notes

References

External links

2000 births
Living people
French footballers
French expatriate footballers
Association football defenders
La Liga academy HPC players
Al-Nasr SC (Dubai) players
Al Dhafra FC players
UAE Pro League players
Expatriate footballers in the United Arab Emirates
French expatriate sportspeople in the United Arab Emirates